The 2013 Pinstripe Bowl was an American college football bowl game that was played on December 28, 2013 at Yankee Stadium in the New York City borough of The Bronx.  It was one of the 2013–14 bowl games that concluded the 2013 FBS football season. The fourth edition of the Pinstripe Bowl, it featured the Rutgers Scarlet Knights (based in nearby New Brunswick, New Jersey) of the American Athletic Conference against the Notre Dame Fighting Irish, an independent team.  It began at 12:00 noon EST and aired on ESPN.  The game was sponsored by the New Era Cap Company, and was officially known as the New Era Pinstripe Bowl.  Notre Dame defeated Rutgers by a score of 29–16. Notre Dame's championship was vacated on February 13, 2018, due to an academic cheating scandal.  Because of this the win will be taken away from Notre Dame record books.

The Fighting Irish accepted their invitation after earning an 8–4 record for the season, while the Scarlet Knights accepted their invitation after earning a 6–6 record.

This was the final game for Rutgers as a member of the American Athletic Conference. They joined the Big Ten Conference in the 2014 season, and the Pinstripe Bowl followed suit with a conference tie-in with the Big Ten starting in 2014.

Teams
The game featured the Rutgers Scarlet Knights of the American Athletic Conference against the Notre Dame Fighting Irish.  It was originally set to feature the Big 12 Conference's seventh bowl-eligible team; however, the conference had only six bowl-eligible teams, leading to Notre Dame accepting the at-large bid.

This was the final game with the two conference tie-ins which had been in place since the bowl's inception in 2010, as from 2014 until at least 2019, the tie-ins will belong to the Big Ten Conference and the Atlantic Coast Conference.  However, both Rutgers and Notre Dame could hypothetically return to the game under the new format, as the Scarlet Knights will be a member of the Big Ten and the Fighting Irish, as a non-football member of the ACC, will have access to the conference's sub-College Football Playoff "New Year's Six" bowl arrangements.

Rutgers Scarlet Knights

After the previous season saw the Scarlet Knights win the Big East Conference's co-championship with a 9–4 overall (5–2 conference) record, expectations diminished slightly for the next season, in particular with the influx of new teams joining the conference, which by season's beginning had transformed into the American Athletic Conference.  While the Scarlet Knights' struggles were tougher than expected, finishing 3–5 in conference play, they managed to finish at 6–6 with a 31–6 victory over the South Florida Bulls in the season's final game, after which bowl director Mark Holtzman extended an invitation to play in the game.

This will be the Scarlet Knights' second Pinstripe Bowl; Rutgers had previously won the 2011 game, defeating the Iowa State Cyclones by a score of 27–13.  In addition, it will be Rutgers' final game as a member of the American before moving to the Big Ten Conference for 2014.

Notre Dame Fighting Irish

After the success of the previous season which led to a berth in the 2013 BCS National Championship Game (which they lost to Alabama by a score of 42–14), the Irish's expectations were moderately scaled back because of various departures.  However, the Irish still managed a winning season at 8–4 overall, after which bowl director Mark Holtzman extended an invitation to play in the game.

Although this will be Notre Dame's first Pinstripe Bowl, the Fighting Irish are no strangers to Yankee Stadium or its predecessor.  The Irish best remember Yankee Stadium as a frequent battleground for their rivalry with the Army Black Knights, it being the site of their games from 1923–1946 (with the exception of 1930's game), as well as in 1969 and 2010, with notable matchups including the famous "Win one for the Gipper" game in 1926, which saw the Irish triumph by a score of 7–0, as well as the 1946 "Game of the Century" between #2 Notre Dame and #1 Army which ended in a scoreless tie.  Overall, the Irish are 15–5–3 in said games at Yankee Stadium.

Game summary
Placekicker Kyle Brindza of Notre Dame set a Pinstripe Bowl record with five field goals in a game.

Box score

Statistics

Academic cheating controversy
Following the revelation that several Notre Dame player's had academically cheated during their time on the football team, the NCAA ruled that Notre Dame's wins from the 2012 and 2013 seasons would be vacated, including the Pinstripe Bowl win.

References

External links
 Box score at ESPN

Pinstripe Bowl
Pinstripe Bowl
Notre Dame Fighting Irish football bowl games
Rutgers Scarlet Knights football bowl games
Pinstripe Bowl
Pinstripe Bowl
2010s in the Bronx